Hněvkovice is a municipality and village in Havlíčkův Brod District in the Vysočina Region of the Czech Republic. It has about 600 inhabitants.

Administrative parts
Villages of Budeč, Chotěměřice, Habrovčice, Nová Ves u Dolních Kralovic, Štičí, Velká Paseka and Zahájí are administrative parts of Hněvkovice.

References

Villages in Havlíčkův Brod District